Oliver Cooper (born 1987) is an English Conservative politician and a prominent party activist. He was the leader of the party on Camden London Borough Council representing Hampstead Town.

Career 
Cooper attended Dr Challoner's Grammar School and University College London. He is a lawyer and a former journalist.

He was elected to represent Hampstead Town ward on Camden Council in 2015. He became the Leader of the Opposition after the 2018 elections. Ahead of the 2022 Camden Borough elections, Cooper chose to move from his 'safe' Conservative ward to the Tory-Liberal Democrat split ward of Belsize to try to increase his party's number of seats. He increased his party's share of the vote and came first among the Conservative candidates, but lost to the Lib Dems, ending his career in local government. Local newspapers said that he "almost certainly" would have held his Hampstead seat if he had not chosen to move to Belsize.

After his defeat, he became the chairman of the Watford Conservatives. He was previously the deputy chairperson of the Hampstead and Kilburn Conservatives.

He has appeared in the national news for campaigning to hire more police, highlighting some Labour members disrupting a minute's silence for Tessa Jowell, securing an official rebuke of Sadiq Khan for allegedly misusing crime statistics in 2018, attacking the Revolutionary Communist Group speaking in Camden Council, intervening and stopping Islamophobic violence on the London Underground in September 2019 and helping get rid of anti-Semitic graffiti in his area in December 2019. In 2022, The Times and The Daily Telegraph reported his criticism of censoring or removing statues in Camden of Mahatma Gandhi, Virginia Woolf, and other figures. He wrote in The Telegraph in 2015, unsuccessfully asking Tories not to vote for Jeremy Corbyn as Labour leader, which left-wing commentator Owen Jones later called a 'prophetic warning'.

Cooper was the national chairman of the Conservative youth organisation Conservative Future from 2013 to 2014. The Times reported that the organisation was "working really really well" until he was a victim of Mark Clarke in the nationally reported "Tatler Tory" bullying scandal. Cooper stood down after Clarke threatened to spread false rumours about him if he stood for re-election leading to Clarke replacing him with Clarke's lover. He had previously relaunched the European Young Conservatives.

Revitalisation of Belsize Village 

As leader of the Conservative Group of Camden Council, Cooper supported the development of the Belsize Village Streatery in the summer of 2020 as a measure to mitigate the negative impacts of the COVID-19 pandemic on the local economy and help continue the revitalisation of the community started by the Belsize Village Business Association in October 2018. Cooper coordinated the release of £55,911 in community infrastructure levy (CIL) funds (£18,637 from each ward of Belsize, Frognal and Fitzjohns and Hampstead Town) to fund the Belsize Village Streatery. As the first scheme of its kind after the end of Lockdown 1 of COVID-19 restrictions in the UK, the Belsize Village Streatery received a ministerial visit on July 30, 2020 by then-Secretary of State Robert Jenrick, whose visit was hosted by Cooper. 

According to the Belsize Village Business Association, the Belsize Village Streatery "helped save several businesses and over 100 local jobs." Data from Camden Council showed that amidst the height of the COVID-19 pandemic, spending in Belsize Village rose 111.6% year-on-year to August-Oct 2020 against an overall difficult economic backdrop. A 14-day consultation held by Camden Council in the summer of 2021 found that 91.5% of residents and businesses supported extending the Belsize Village Streatery. On 10 February 2022, Cooper spoke in favour of making the Belsize Village Streatery permanent at the Camden Council Licensing Committee; the permanence of the scheme was approved at the meeting. At the licensing committee, Cooper said, "The revitalisation of Belsize Village has been nothing short of a miracle in the last two years."

References 

Councillors in the London Borough of Camden
Conservative Party (UK) councillors
1987 births
Living people
English people of Lebanese descent
English people of Irish descent
People educated at Dr Challoner's Grammar School
Alumni of University College London